The Fourche Creek watershed is arguably the most important urban watershed in the state of Arkansas in the United States for ecological, economic, and social reasons.

Course
Tributaries to Fourche Creek include Fourche Bayou, Rock Creek, Otter Creek, Brodie Creek, Crooked Creek, and Panther Creek, as well as several smaller streams.

Environmental factors
The watershed drains and filters runoff from 73% of Little Rock, Arkansas’s capital city, and drains into Fourche Creek. The city's wastewater treatment plant is located immediately above the Fourche/Arkansas River confluence, and the city of Little Rock cites the economic value and savings from natural purification in the Fourche Bottomlands to be in the millions of dollars.

Despite suffering decades of neglect and abuse, Fourche Creek supports a highly diverse population of flora and fauna and a core bottomland region that still maintains its wetland functions. The watershed also acts as an urban restoration area for education and demonstration. A revitalized watershed is of tremendous economic and social importance to Central Arkansas.

The Arkansas branch of the National Audubon Society is currently conducting numerous outreach, education, water quality improvement, and habitat improvement projects in the Fourche Creek watershed.

References

External links
Fourche Creek at Audubon Arkansas

Estuaries of the United States
Rivers of Pulaski County, Arkansas
Rivers of Saline County, Arkansas
Tributaries of the Arkansas River
Watersheds of the United States